Ivar Roslund (4 July 1907 – 1988) was a Swedish footballer who played as a midfielder.

References

Association football midfielders
Swedish footballers
Allsvenskan players
Malmö FF players
1907 births
1988 deaths